The Town of Collbran is a Statutory Town located in Mesa County, Colorado, United States. The town population was 369 at the 2020 United States Census. Collbran is a part of the Grand Junction, CO Metropolitan Statistical Area.

Description

The town is located east of Grand Junction along Plateau Creek, at the upper (eastern) end of the small cattle ranching valley around the creek known as the Plateau Valley. The largest community in the valley, it serves a civic and economic center for the surrounding area, which is dependent not only ranching, but on pass-through tourism during the summer and autumn months. In the latter capacity, the town acts somewhat as a gateway to nearby Vega State Park and other recreational sites along the northeast side of the Grand Mesa via the Grand Mesa Scenic and Historic Byway.

Geography
Collbran is located at  (39.239217, -107.966230).

Demographics

As of the census of 2000, there were 388 people, 145 households, and 100 families residing in the town. The racial makeup of the town was 98.20% White, 0.26% Native American, 0.77% from other races, and 0.77% from two or more races. Hispanic or Latino of any race were 4.12% of the population.

There were 145 households, out of which 36.6% had children under the age of 18 living with them, 53.8% were married couples living together, 9.7% had a female householder with no husband present, and 31.0% were non-families. 27.6% of all households were made up of individuals, and 12.4% had someone living alone who was 65 years of age or older.  The average household size was 2.50 and the average family size was 3.03.

In the town, the population was spread out, with 29.6% under the age of 18, 3.6% from 18 to 24, 26.8% from 25 to 44, 23.5% from 45 to 64, and 16.5% who were 65 years of age or older.  The median age was 38 years. For every 100 females, there were 87.4 males.  For every 100 females age 18 and over, there were 84.5 males.

The median income for a household in the town was $32,500, and the median income for a family was $36,016. Males had a median income of $28,438 versus $27,917 for females. The per capita income for the town was $17,080.  About 5.9% of families and 14.7% of the population were below the poverty line, including 17.2% of those under age 18 and 8.0% of those age 65 or over.

Climate
The Köppen Climate Classification subtype for this climate is "Dfb"  (Warm Summer Continental Climate).

See also

 List of municipalities in Colorado

References

External links

 
 CDOT map of the town of Collbran

Towns in Mesa County, Colorado
Towns in Colorado